Min Min Thu (born 30 March 1988) is a Burmese footballer and a midfielder for Myanmar national football team. He is the bronze medalist with Myanmar U23 in 2011 SEA Games.

He currently plays for Ayeyawady United in Myanmar National League. In March 2016, The Disciplinary Committee imposed a two-match suspension and a fine of two hundred thousand each on Keith and Min Min Thu, who were shown a red card in the match between the Ayeyawady United and Yadanarbon F.C. in the Myanmar National League (12) match.

International goals
Scores and results are list Myanmar's goal tally first.

Honours

National Team
Philippine Peace Cup (1): 2014

Club

Ayeyawady United
MFF Cup (2):  2012, 2014
2015 General Aung San Shield:

References

1988 births
Living people
Burmese footballers
Myanmar international footballers
Ayeyawady United F.C. players
Association football forwards
Southeast Asian Games bronze medalists for Myanmar
Southeast Asian Games medalists in football
Competitors at the 2011 Southeast Asian Games